Behisatra is a rural municipality in Madagascar. It belongs to the district of Beroroha, which is a part of Atsimo-Andrefana Region. The population of the commune was estimated to be approximately 15,000 in 2001 commune census.

Only primary schooling is available. The majority 90% of the population of the commune are farmers, while an additional 7% receives their livelihood from raising livestock. The most important crop is rice, while other important products are maize and cassava. Services provide employment for 3% of the population.

References and notes 

Populated places in Atsimo-Andrefana